Fox is an unincorporated community in Pleasant Township, Grant County, Indiana.

History
Fox was named for Edward Fox, a local settler. A post office was established at Fox in 1884, and remained in operation until it was discontinued in 1906.

Geography

References

Unincorporated communities in Grant County, Indiana
Unincorporated communities in Indiana